Isabella Jane Johnston (née Miller) (1891  1976) was a women's activist in Australia, especially in the Perth Women's Service Guilds. She was born in Barrhead, Scotland, and moved to Perth in Western Australia in 1910 to live with her aunt Amelia MacDonald. In 1946 she founded the West Australian Women's Parliament.

References 

1891 births
1976 deaths
20th-century Australian people
British emigrants to Australia
People from Perth, Western Australia
Australian suffragists
20th-century Australian women